The Five Finger Islands Light is a lighthouse located on a small island that lies between Stephens Passage and Frederick Sound in southeastern Alaska.  It and Sentinel Island Light Station were the first U.S. government lighthouses opened in Alaska, first lit on March 21, 1902.

It became the last lighthouse in Alaska to be automated on August 14, 1984.

History
In 1901, a contract of $22,500 was awarded to construct a lighthouse on the southernmost of the Five Finger Islands. Completed in 1902, it was a rectangular lighthouse with a square tower, elevated several feet above the surrounding hipped roof. The original structure burned down in December 1933. The tower was rebuilt using public works appropriations. The current structure is made of concrete, which was completed and relit in 1935. It was automated by the United States Coast Guard in 1984.

It was listed on the National Register of Historic Places as Five Finger Light Station in 2004.  The listing was as a historic district including four contributing buildings and one other contributing structure.

The original lighthouse burned.  The replacement, built in 1935, "is a good example of Modern Movement architecture, popular in the 1930s for concrete buildings, and adapted by the U.S. Lighthouse Service as the agency replaced the original wood frame lighthouse buildings at many of its sixteen staffed stations in Alaska."

The light station was listed on the National Register of Historic Places in 2004.

See also

 List of lighthouses in the United States

References

External links

 United States Coast Guard 
 2007 U.S. postage stamp featuring Five Finger Islands Light
 
 Lighthouse Friends — Five Finger Islands Lighthouse
 

1902 establishments in Alaska
Art Deco architecture in Alaska
Historic districts on the National Register of Historic Places in Alaska
Lighthouses completed in 1902
Lighthouses completed in 1935
Lighthouses on the National Register of Historic Places in Alaska
Buildings and structures on the National Register of Historic Places in Petersburg Borough, Alaska